Scooba was a floor-scrubbing robot made by iRobot.  It was released in limited numbers in December 2005 for the Christmas season, with full production starting in early 2006. The company introduced a lower-priced version, the Scooba 5800, in the second half of 2006. It introduced a new Scooba 450 at CES 2014 in January 2014.

By 2016, the Scooba line of floor-scrubbers were phased out in favor of the Braava line of floor-mopping robots.

Operation
The Scooba used either a special non-bleach cleaning solution named "Scooba juice" (made by the Clorox Company) formulated to clean the floors while discouraging rust or wheel slippage, or the newer Scooba Natural Enzyme cleaning solution. The robot prepared the floor by vacuuming loose debris, squirted clean solution on the floor, scrubbed the floor, and then sucked up the dirty solution leaving a nearly dry floor behind. The robot was safe to use on sealed hardwood floors and most other hard household surfaces, but could not be used on rugs.

Some models of the Scooba included an iRobot Virtual Wall accessory, which projected a beam of infrared light, setting a boundary which the robot would not cross.

The Scooba was the second major commercial product made by iRobot, which popularized vacuum robots with the Roomba. It was available in over 40 countries.

Systems
The Scooba came with four packets of the new "Natural Enzyme" cleaning solution, enough for about four washes. Additional Clorox cleaning solution comes in five- and nine-packs of  bottles, which provided enough solution for about 16 washings per bottle. Polysorbate 20 and tetrapotassium EDTA were the primary ingredients. Some Scooba models could also use white vinegar or plain water in place of the proprietary solution.

Recharge times were typically 3 hours.

Models

The original Scooba
Scooba 5900 was the first Scooba, it could be used with the Scooba Cleaning Solution, or other suitably conductive solutions, but was discontinued in favor of the Scooba 5800 version (basic floor washing model) which could also use plain water in its cleaning tank. iRobot shed several of the 5900's premium features to produce the lower-priced 5800 model. There were no changes to the basic floor cleaning machinery.

Scooba 200 series
Introduced in 2011, the Scooba 230 was a smaller model, less than half the diameter but taller than the previous Scooba models. The reduced diameter allowed the robot to clean more areas in small bathrooms, kitchens, and other tight spaces. In order to reduce the size, the clean water and dirty water tanks were replaced with an internal clean water bladder in a sealed compartment that holds the dirty water, allowing the dirty water storage to expand as the clean water was used up. It worked the same way as the other scooba's, only there is no scrubbing brushes, but bristles. Only Scooba cleaning solution and water are recommended as vinegar and the original cleaning solution will damage the bladder. The initial vacuuming stage present in other Scooba models was also removed, requiring users to sweep up or vacuum loose debris ahead of time.

Scooba 300 series
The Scooba 300 series replaced the original 5000 series robots. They were similar in design and size to the original Scooba and used Scooba cleaning solution, vinegar solution, or plain water.  The robots in this series were differentiated by the size of the area they could clean on a single charge, and the accessories supplied.
It also included charging base, storage mat, and an extra Virtual Wall (for a total of two). 
Scooba 385 (European version of US 380 model) doesn't include charging base, storage mat or extra Virtual Wall (only one included).
Scooba 390 (Longer battery life, new color scheme).

Scooba 450
The fourth generation Scooba 450 was introduced at the Consumer Electronics Show 2014. It could mop tile, wood, linoleum, and more. It uses a three-stage cleaning process. First, it sweeps and pre-soaks the floor with cleaning solution, and then it scrubs the floor and squeegees the dirty solution.

Discontinuation 
iRobot launched the Braava line of floor mopping robots in 2013, which eventually replaced the Scooba brand by 2016.

References

External links
 Scooba homepage
 Scooba Product Page
 Scooba manual 
 PC Magazine review
 Time gadget of the week
 USA Today review

Home appliance brands
Domestic robots
IRobot
2005 robots